The Arapiuns River is a river in Pará state in north-central Brazil. It is a tributary of the Tapajós, and merges into the latter river about  before Tapajós merges into the Amazon River. Arapiuns is a blackwater river.

See also
List of rivers of Pará

References
Brazilian Ministry of Transport

Rivers of Pará